The Dakota County Tribune is an American, English language weekly newspaper headquartered in Apple Valley, Minnesota and serves the Apple Valley, Farmington, and Rosemount communities in Dakota County, Minnesota.  The newspaper was founded in 1884.

History
The Dakota County Tribune was founded in Farmington on March 6, 1884 by Clarence P. Carpenter.  It launched a free newspaper, ThisWeek, in 1979, which is now called Sun This Week.  The headquarters was moved to Burnsville in 1984 and later to Apple Valley where it is now located.  It launched its first website in 1997.

The Dakota County Tribune print edition had a circulation of 9,002 in 2019.

Previous names for the Dakota County Tribune include:
 Dakota County Tribune (1912current)
 Dakota County tribune and Farmington herald (Farmington, Dakota County, Minn.) (1910-1912)
 The Lakeville Leader (Lakeville, Dakota County, Minn.) (1912-1930)
 Dakota County Tribune (Farmington, Minn.) (1884-1910)

The Dakota County Tribune'' is owned by Adams Publishing Group and is in the Central Division of the company.

References

Newspapers published in Minnesota
Dakota County, Minnesota